The Jaded Hearts Club is an English rock supergroup and covers band consisting of vocalists Miles Kane (of the Rascals and Last Shadow Puppets) and Nic Cester (of Jet), bassist and vocalist Matt Bellamy (of Muse), guitarists Graham Coxon (of Blur) and Jamie Davis (of Coxon's former label Transcopic), and drummer Sean Payne (of the Zutons). 

The band initially performed under the name Dr. Pepper's Jaded Hearts Club Band and performed covers of Beatles. Their repertoire expanded to include rock and roll songs by bands including Cream, the Who and the Kinks. They released an album of covers, You've Always Been Here, in 2020, to mixed reviews.

History

Formation 
In September 2017, the musician Jamie Davis formed the Jaded Hearts Club to perform covers of Beatles songs at his 40th birthday party. He initially planned to hire a covers band, but decided it would be cheaper to ask his musician friends to perform with him instead. The band initially performed under the name Dr. Pepper's Jaded Hearts Club Band; their name references the 1967 Beatles album Sgt Pepper's Lonely Hearts Club Band.

Guitarist Matt Bellamy of Muse said the band began "as a karaoke joke"; they decided to continue as they enjoyed themselves and felt other bands were not performing traditional rock and roll. Bellamy said: "Going back to that really great songwriting, some of the best historic songwriting ever, and just playing it almost like a jazz band, real instruments, no gizmos, no tech, nothing like that."

Performances 
In 2018, the Jaded Hearts Club played gigs at the Austin South by Southwest festival, in bars in Chicago and Los Angeles, and at a Teenage Cancer Trust show in the Royal Albert Hall. In addition to Beatles songs, they performed songs by bands including Cream, the Who and the Kinks. The membership changed depending on availability, with appearances by musicians including Dominic Howard and Christopher Wolstenholme of Muse, Ilan Rubin, and Chris Cester. Paul McCartney joined them to perform at a 2018 event for his daughter Stella McCartney. In 2019, the band performed a charity show at the 100 Club, at which point the lineup settled.

You've Always Been Here (2020) 
The first Jaded Hearts Club album, You've Always Been Here, was released in October 2020, comprising covers of classic rock-and-roll and Motown songs. It was produced by Bellamy and recorded in his studio shortly before the COVID-19 pandemic lockdown. The album holds a rating of 60 out of 100 on the review aggregate site Metacritic, indicating "mixed or average reviews". The Independent called it a "carefree celebration" and awarded it four out of five. NME saw it as "well-intentioned but often unlistenable dad-rock", while DIY described it as "fucking dire" and a waste of the members' talents.

Band members
 Graham Coxon – guitar, backing vocals
 Miles Kane – lead vocals
 Nic Cester – lead vocals
 Matt Bellamy – bass, vocals
 Sean Payne – drums, backing vocals
 Jamie Davis – rhythm guitar, backing vocals

Discography

Albums
Studio album
 You've Always Been Here (October 2, 2020)

Live album
 Live at the 100 Club (January 17, 2020)

Singles
 "Nobody But Me" (March 2, 2020)
 "This Love Starved Heart of Mine (It's Killing Me)" (April 15, 2020)
 "We'll Meet Again / Reach Out I'll Be There" (July 31, 2020)
 "Love's Gone Bad" (September 2, 2020)

References
10. Live Review of the Jaded Hearts Club performance at The 100 Club on 4/6/19. musomuso.com

Rock music supergroups
The Beatles tribute bands
Cover bands
Musical groups established in 2017
Musical groups from Los Angeles
2017 establishments in California
American rock music groups
American supergroups